The 4th Women's Chess Olympiad, organized by FIDE, took place on 8–23 September 1969 in Lublin, Poland.

Results
A total of 15 two-woman teams entered the competition. It was played as a round-robin tournament.

{| class="wikitable"
! # !!Country !! Players !! Points !! MP
|-
| style="background:gold;"|1 ||  || Nona Gaprindashvili, Alla Kushnir, Nana Alexandria|| 26 || 
|-
| style="background:silver;"|2 ||  || Mária Ivánka, Zsuzsa Verőci, Károlyné Honfi || 20½ || 
|-
| style="background:#cc9966;"|3 ||  || Štěpánka Vokřálová, Květa Eretová, Jana Malypetrová || 19 || 
|-
| 4 ||  || Tereza Štadler, Henrijeta Konarkowska-Sokolov, Katarina Jovanović-Blagojević || 18½ || 
|-
| 5 ||  || Venka Asenova, Evelina Trojanska, Antonina Georgieva || 17½ || 
|-
| 6 ||  || Waltraud Nowarra, Edith Keller-Herrmann, Gabriele Just || 17 || 
|-
| 7 ||  || Elisabeta Polihroniade, Gertrude Baumstark, Suzana Makai || 16½ || 17
|-
| 8 ||  || Krystyna Hołuj-Radzikowska, Mirosława Litmanowicz, Anna Jurczyńska || 16½ || 17
|-
| 9 ||  || Ingrid Tuk, Hendrika Timmer, Fenny Heemskerk || 13 || 
|-
| 10 ||  || Dinah Dobson, Rowena Mary Bruce || 12½ ||
|-
| 11 ||  || Ursula Wasnetsky, Hannelore Jörger, Irmgard Kärner || 10 || 10 
|-
| 12 ||  || Merete Haahr, Ingrid Larsen, Johanne Nielsen || 10 ||  8
|-
| 13 ||  || Ingeborg Kattinger, Maria Ager, Wilma Samt || 6 || 
|-
| 14 ||  || Caroline Vanderbeken, Louise-Jeanne Loeffler || 4½ ||
|-
| 15 ||  || Mary Brannagan, Aileen Noonan, Elizabeth Shaughnessy || 2½ ||
|}

Individual medals
 Board 1:  Nona Gaprindashvili 9½ / 10 = 95%
 Board 2:  Alla Kushnir 8½ / 9 = 94.4%
 Reserve Board:  Nana Alexandria 8/ 9 = 88.9%

References

External links
Women's Chess Olympiad: Lublin 1969 OlimpBase

Women's Chess Olympiads
Olympiad w4
Chess Olympiad w4
Olympiad w4
Chess Olympiad w4
September 1969 sports events in Europe